Bambú is a station on Line 1 of the Madrid Metro, opened on 4 November, 2007. It is located in fare Zone A.

References 

Line 1 (Madrid Metro) stations
Railway stations in Spain opened in 2007
Buildings and structures in Chamartín District, Madrid